Longitarsus albus is a yellow coloured species of beetle from the Chrysomelidae family that can be found in Algeria, Israel, and Morocco.

References

A
Beetles described in 2001
Beetles of North Africa
Beetles of Asia